Nissafors is a locality situated in Gnosjö Municipality, Jönköping County, Sweden with 285 inhabitants in 2010.

References 

Populated places in Jönköping County
Populated places in Gnosjö Municipality